Hortencio Pereira (born Hortencio Saluzinho Eduardo Vaz e Pereira; 11 January 1953), is a Konkani stage actor from Goa. He is a lyricist, writer, actor, comedian, and singer.

Early life 
He was born on 11 January 1953 at Curchorem to Custodio Jose Pereira, a Toddy Tapper from Chandor, Goa and Conceicao Vaz, a house-wife from Dabal, Goa. He went to Guardian Angel High School in Curchorem and pass his S.S.C in 1971. He graduated in BA (psychology) from The Parvatibai Chowgule College, Margao, Goa in the Year 1975. While in the family were not inclined towards Tiatr, his elder brother, Late Chrispino Pereira would sing and act in local village Tiatrs.

Career (1965–present)

Acting 
Pereira portrayed in his first Tiatr "Sukh ani Dukh" in 1965 for the Chapel Feast at Pontemol, Curchorem when he was 12 years old. The Tiatr was written and directed by Shri. Jose Fernandes, one of the village directors at that time. He was later picked by Albert Colaco, a writer from Sanvorderm who scripted and presented his Tiatr "Nimnno Ekuch Pelo". His first commercial stint was in the Tiatr "Noxibantlim Khoddpam" by Jess Fernandes from Quepem in1968. He performed as a Lead Actor / Comedian for some of the topmost writers and directors of his times viz. Late. M. Boyer, Late. Remmie Colaco, Late. C. Alvares, Late. Prem Kumar, Late. Bab Petre, Late. Jacinto Vaz, Late. Airistedes Dias, Late. Alfred Rose, Late. Fr. Planton Faria, Late. Robin Vaz, John Claro, Mike Mehta, Joe Rose, Anil-Fatima, Wilmix-Sharon, C.D'Silva, Tony Dias, Anthony San, Mendes Brothers, Jr. Nelson, Rico Rod, Peter Roshan, Tausif de Navelim, Anil Olga, Late. William de Curtorim etc.

Besides this, Hortencio also has performed in the Non-Stop Dramas directed by Late. Rosario Rodrigues, Late. Rosario Dias, Patrick Dourado, John D'Silva, Menino De Bandar, Pascoal Rodrigues, Milagres De Chandor, Menino Mario, Jose Rod, C. D'Silva, Christopher-Meena etc.

Entry on stage as a comedian came about in Prem Kumar's Tiatr "Khotto Poiso" at first, which followed by C Alvares' Tiatr "Tuje Dolle" which later went to Gulf. In Tiatr "Tuje Dolle", the lead actor Remmie Colaco did not turn up. Hortencio landed up handling the lead and comedy roles simultaneously, showcasing two dialects who named Bardez and Salcette respectively. Along with Salcette and Bardez, he can also speak fluent Mangalorean Konkani and perform musical shows in Mangalore. he has also doled out performances in Hindi Orchestras.

Scripting and directing 
Hortencio's first script was penned down at the age of 15 for Village Feast. At age Seventeen, he started scripting one act plays for the inter village one act play competition. He begged the Awards for Best Writer, Best Director and Best Actor for three consecutive years in the inter village one act play competition held from 1970 to 1972 for his play "Guireskai", "Onath" and "Tyag". Every year, during the Feast of St. Anthony, Hortencio would gather local Actors and stage his Tiatr. After staging each of the Tiatr at the chapel, they were presented in surrounding villages like Sanguem, Uguem, and Rivona which with the help of local youth. Some of his most notable Tiatrs are "Doulot" (1969), "Odruxt" (1970), "Onath" (1974) and "Bhas" (1980). He is known to write his scripts in "Devnagri" as well as "Roman".

An article was published by O Heraldo on 4 March 2019, He shared the story of why he gave up as a Writer & Director. As per Hortencio, when Tiatr "Bhas" was staged, one of the most noted Artist, Remmie Colaco was invited as a chief guest. After the show, Remmie Colaco encouraged Hortencio to stage the show all over Goa with assistance of Professional Cast. In the year 1985, Hortencio booked 7 shows all over go along with Professional Artists that included Remmie Colaco, Anthony San, Angela, Telles Moraes, Willie-Luiza, and Com. Joanna, but the most notable Artist was M.Boyer who is in his prime. when the first show was held in Margao, M.Boyer never turned up. Hortencio quickly hired a Pilot (Motorcyclist) and went to M.Boyers residence in Raia. His wife stated that he was ill, but Hortencio spotted him playing Carrom at Neighbors resident. After several pleading, he declined and Hortencio went back to the auditorium completely disappointed. Left with no other options, he explained the situation to the audience and requested to watch the show. If they unsatisfied, they could come back stage and take a refund. The show started and M.Boyers role was played by Hortencios elder brother. He shares in an interview that the audience returned home satisfied, among whom, was noted Artist, Late. Prem Kumar was equally happy with show.

Due to M.Boyer's Absence, spectators from other places like Sanvordem, Vasco, Panjim returned their tickets, which caused him a loss of 15000 INR ( INR as of 2019). Hortencio vowed to never to script and stage a Tiatr again, but continued his career as an Actor and singer-songwriter as well as write comedy for his acts. He later went on to act and sing for Goa's top most directors. After almost a decade, Director & Political Singer, Late. William de Curtorim encouraged Hortencio to take up writing again & he became a ghost writer for the Late Artist by penning down six Tiatrs. During this time, Hortencio also introduced his Nephew, Com. Nato on the stage. Later, Hortencio joined Anthony Sylvester's troupe which led to an enmity between Hortencio & William de Curtorim. but due to him leaving William de Curtorim's troupe, he started receiving offers from other directors as well. In the year 2016, Hortencio penned down a Tiatr, "Hanv Vetam" which was staged during the annual Tiatr competition held by Kala Academy, Goa. The Tiatr was one of its kind for staging an entire cast as well as other units like Musicians, Lighting, Sound etc. from one Village i.e. Sanvordem. Hortencio wrote the script, comedy and songs all by himself as well as Acted and Sang in the Tiatr. In 2019, Hortencio wrote another Tiatr, "DySp Toney Tavares".

Singing and Song-writing 
Hortencio has composed over 500 songs which were sung either by himself or someone else. almost all of his lyrics were based on Morals. He composed and sang most of the opening songs for some of the most notable directors, including C. Alvares, Bab Peter, Prem Kumar, Mendes Brothers etc. Melody King of Goa, Late. Alfred Rose sang the song "Khotte Vis", in the audio cassette "Bapaiche Tyag", even though he would only sing his own composition. Hortencio gave the seconds for the same. He has also staged Musical Shows as well as performed in Musical Shows of Late. Chris Perry, Late. Alfred Rose, Aniceto, Soccoro de St. Cruz, Anthony San, Wilmix-Sharon, Mil-Mel-Nel, Late. Ulhas Buyao etc. he was also a regular performer for Neves Olieveiro's Orchestra, held in Mumbai, with Goa's Nightingale, Lorna.

During his College days, Hortencio won the best Poet Award (English) for 2 consecutive years from 1972 to 1973. He has produced 10 audio albums namely, "Avoicho Mog", "Sovostkaiechim Lharam", "Rochnar", "Khobrank Lagon", Bapaiche Tyag", "Mondir", "Kantteancho Mukutt", "Alvito D'cunha", "Kumaricho King" & "Avoicho Mog (Re-Release) ". Some of his most famous songs include "Very Good, Very Good" and "Xezari" which were originally written by Late. Domnic Vaz, but was improvised by Hortencio. As per sources close to Hortencio, he was the writer behind Chris Perry's famous song, "Kontrad Sansnacho". Sources claimed that the music was composed by Late. Chris Perry and the lyrics were written by Hortencio for which he was paid the required royalty. Hortencio has never confirmed the same, nor he has ever commented on it. In 2018, Hortencio composed the song "Nokre Tuje", which was sung by Shine on Duo. As of 2019, Hortencio was set to release his 11th Audio album, which will include 12 Tracks in 3 different languages (English, Konkanni and Hindi). All the lyrics will be written by Hortencio. He is also one of the few Artiste to have performed in every Orchestra Group.

Controversies

Church Conflicts 
Hortencio sparked controversy in his village of Curchorem when he openly sang about the church conflicts which was one of the most sensitive topics during the time. one night, after a football game, Hortencio was followed by two locals on his way home, who wanted to confront him. However, he realized what was happening and quickly drove to his relatives house nearby.

Kumaricho King 
Hortencio's most controversial album was "Kumaricho King" which was one of his most famous as well as widely sold album. He received various phone calls from fans in Goa, as well as Goans settled abroad. He was praised by many as well as criticized by some. It all started when Hortencio sang a song about his dear friend Late. Alfred Rose who was also called as Melody King and Man with a golden voice. at the end of the song, Hortencio claimed that there will never be another Melody King on the Tiatr Stage. As per Hortencio, at the time he had no idea that Lawry Travasso also called himself Melody King. Lawry was furious about the song and as a revenge he wrote and released a song titled "Potence" in his album, "Saibinnik Okman Korinaka". The song was to demean Hortencio in which he claims that Hortencio is an alcoholic and he would steal money from his Ex-Boss, Irineu Gonsalves and take his friends out for a drink. after the song was released, the very next day, Irineu Gonsalves gave a notice on O Heraldo in which he claimed that all the allegations made against Hortencio were false and that he is not involved in any of it. As Lawry called himself Melody King, Hortencio decided to name his next audio album "Kumaricho King" in which he retaliated by singing about Lawry's relationships which was another controversial topic. Hortencio and Lawry finally settled their conflicts and also performed for the same Musical shows.

Atankvadi Goyant Naka 
Hortencio was also a cast member of one of Goa's the most controversial drama, "Atankvadi Goyant Naka" which was written and directed by Tausif de Navelim. On the day of the first show, Tausif and the rest of the cast, were escorted to the auditorium by police following threat calls by unknown callers.

Personal life 
Hortencio has been married to his wife Matilda for more than 30 years and has 3 children. From the year 1982 – 1986, he was an English and Geography Professor for Don Bosco School, Rivona. Besides, performing as an Artiste, he has been an L.I.C. Agent for 18 years. Hortencio & his wife Matilda also run a very successful company called "Mathor Chemicals" which is mostly handled by his wife. his company mainly deals in production & supply of Toiletries. Most of his customers are based in south Goa which gives him enough time to supply the orders during his free time. He was a devoted Goan Catholic and visits the church every Sunday with his wife Matilda. Hortencio has been sober all his life & claims to have never touched a bottle of alcohol. On his wedding day, he never drank wine which is Traditional in Catholic weddings. when asked by the priest, he joked by stating, "from this day we are one body and one soul, so it does not make a difference who drinks the wine". Hortencio is a Soccer fan. He represented his School, College for 4 years & was also the captain of his team. He also won the best player award for inter village tournaments. Until 2017, at the age of 64, he was an active veteran Footballer. He also attended the Germany vs Mexico match held at Luzhniki Stadium on 17 June for the FIFA World Cup 2018.

Illness and Health 
In 2018, Hortencio unexpectedly took ill and at the request of the doctors, had to take a break from Singing and Acting for 6 months. After being treated for almost 7 Months, he stated in an interview with O Heraldo published on 4 March 2019, that he will not get back into acting immediately as to not cause any kind of embarrassment to the directors.

Stage Credit

Albums

Awards

References

External links
Tiatrist Hortencio’s fans got to know him

Konkani people
Konkani theatre
Konkani-language writers
Konkani-language singers
People from Goa
Culture of Goa
Tiatrists
People from South Goa district
1953 births
Living people